The siege of Zoutleeuw or the siege of Léau (29 August 1705 – 5 September 1705) was a siege of the War of the Spanish Succession. Allied troops with 16 artillery pieces under the command of the English Captain general the Duke of Marlborough, besieged and captured the small French-held Flemish fortified town of Zoutleeuw in the Spanish Netherlands.

Prelude
After piercing the French fortified lines Lines of Brabant at Elixheim on 18 July 1705, the Duke of Marlborough found his plans to bring the French army under Duc de Villeroi to a decisive battle frustrated by the French refusal to engage, their extensive use of field fortifications and the unwillingness of the Dutch Field Deputies to submit to his plans. The Allies contented themselves by widening the breach in the lines of Brabant by capturing Zoutleeuw to the north of Eliksem on 5 September. Zoutleeuw had been hastily abandoned by the French troops of the Duke of Berwick in July, after the Allied capture of Huy, with gaps being blown up in the walls.

Siege
Zoutleeuw, surrounded by swamps, was taken by a small detachment of two battalions troops with 16 artillery pieces under the command of lieutenant general Dedem. The town was invested on 29 August and trenches were opened on 31 August. The Allied siege train arrived from Maastricht on 3 September. That same night, the besiegers attacked and captured a redoubt with little opposition. The infantry battalions carried the trenches within 100 yards of the town, the siege artillery quickly following them.

Before the Allied artillery batteries could open fire, the French governor brigadier general Dumont decided to surrender on 4 September after Dedem threatened to kill the entire garrison of 400 men if they continued to resist. The town and citadel were occupied by 200 Allied troops on 5 September. The garrison marched out on 7 September to become prisoners of war in Maastricht, the officers being allowed to retain their swords and baggage.

Aftermath
The Allies took 10 bronze guns, eight iron guns, two bronze mortars, 10,000 grenades, 200 barrels of gunpowder, 6,000 tools, 2,000 muskets, 100 barrels of musket balls and 18,000 sacks of flour.

The siege was the last major Allied operation near the Meuse river as the strong French fortresses of Namur and Charleroi and more tempting targets in Brabant discouraged them from moving upriver. Marlborough had the Lines of Brabant levelled and the town of Tirlemont dismantled.

Citations

Bibliography
 

Siege of Zoutleeuw
Sieges involving France
Sieges involving England
Sieges involving Scotland
Sieges involving the Dutch Republic
Sieges involving the Holy Roman Empire
Sieges of the War of the Spanish Succession
Battles of the War of the Spanish Succession
Battles involving the Spanish Netherlands
Siege
Siege
18th century in the Southern Netherlands